Stained Glass, Soma Fountains is a compilation album by the Legendary Pink Dots, issued in 1997 on Soleilmoon Records.  The album covers several tracks from the group's early career; some were previously released on small and independent labels, while others were private demos.

It was originally intended for these songs to be included as bonus tracks on Soleilmoon's CD reissues of the early Legendary Pink Dots albums, but contractual reasons prevented this.

"April's Song" dates from 1980, when the group was still known as One Day.

Track listing
A Pale Green Introduction/Love on a Pale Green Postage Stamp
Premonition 12
Mmmmmmmmmmmm ... (first version)
The Lifesucker
The Divorce
Jungle (first version)
The Haunted Supermarket
No Bell No Prize
Plague 2
Find The Lady
Judith A Hum/Praum Naizh/A Pale Green Sequel
Suicide Pact
Waiting For The Call/You 'n' Me
April's Song
Frosty
Defeated
A Message From Our Sponsor (first version)
Ice Baby Cometh
Hanging Gardens (Flow Motion version)
Jack/Thursday Night Fever #1/Die With Your Eyes On/Opus Dei
Premonition 18 (part one)
Premonition 18 (part two)

Personnel
Edward Ka-Spel:  keyboards, vocal
The Silverman (Phil Knight):  keyboards

References

The Legendary Pink Dots albums
1997 albums